Tobias Schlingensiepen (born November 24, 1963) is a Democratic member of the Kansas House of Representatives, representing the 55th district since 2023. Schlingensiepen was elected in the 2022 general election following the retirement of Democratic incumbent representative Annie Kuether.

Committee membership

 Energy, Utilities and Telecommunications
 Agriculture and Natural Resources
 Corrections and Juvenile Justice

References

Democratic Party members of the Kansas House of Representatives
Living people
21st-century American politicians
Politicians from Berlin
1963 births